Koropi (before 1927: Μπούφα - Boufa) is a village in the municipal unit of Milies, Magnesia regional unit, Greece. Koropi is situated on the Pelion peninsula, on the coast of the Pagasetic Gulf. Its population in 2011 was 246. Koropi is 2 km southeast of Kala Nera, 4 km east of Milies and 19 km southeast of Volos. The name Koropi was taken from the ancient city Korope, which dates from the 8th century BC. It was a small city that had a Temple of Apollo.

Population

See also

List of settlements in the Magnesia regional unit

References

Populated places in Magnesia (regional unit)